Camp Diana-Dalmaqua was a summer sleepaway camp in Glen Spey in the Catskill Mountains of New York State. Founded in the 1920s as two separate camps, Diana-Dalmaqua was typical of the numerous camps which served (and still serve) the children of the New York City metropolitan area.  The camp was typical of many in the area offering a variety of activities including sports, drama and arts and crafts.

Notable alumni
Sandy Baron
Robert Iger
Penny Marshall
Laurie Korn Mika

References

External links
Unofficial Camp Diana-Dalmaqua website

Diana-Dalmaqua
Diana-Dalmaqua
Catskills
Jews and Judaism in Sullivan County, New York